The 2022-2023 mpox outbreak in the Republic of Ireland is part of the larger ongoing global outbreak of human mpox caused by Clade II of the monkeypox virus. The first case in the Republic was confirmed on 27 May 2022.

Background

Transmission 

A large portion of those infected were believed to have not recently traveled to areas of Africa where mpox is normally found, such as Nigeria, the Democratic Republic of the Congo as well as central and western Africa. It is believed to be transmitted by close contact with sick people, with extra caution for those individuals with lesions on their skin or genitals, along with their bedding and clothing. The CDC has also stated that individuals should avoid contact and consumption of dead animals such as rats, squirrels, monkeys and apes along with wild game or lotions derived from animals in Africa.

In addition to more common symptoms, such as fever, headache, swollen lymph nodes, and rashes or lesions, some patients have also experienced proctitis, an inflammation of the rectum lining. CDC has also warned clinicians to not rule out mpox in patients with sexually transmitted infections since there have been reports of co-infections with syphilis, gonorrhea, chlamydia, and herpes.

Statistics 
As of 15 March 2023, the Health Protection Surveillance Centre (HPSC) had been notified of 228 cases of mpox, no deaths have been recorded so far.

Timeline

See also 
Human mpox
Monkeypox virus
2022–2023 mpox outbreak

Notes

References

Republic of Ireland
Mpox
Mpox